Vessels is the third album by American alternative rock band Ivoryline, and their second with record label Tooth & Nail, released on July 27, 2010.

Track listing

2010 albums
Tooth & Nail Records albums
Ivoryline albums
Albums produced by Aaron Sprinkle